The 63rd Brigade was a formation of  the British Army. It was raised as part of the new army also known as Kitchener's Army and assigned to the 21st Division and served on the Western Front during the First World War. In July 1916 the brigade was transferred to the 37th Division.

Formation
The infantry battalions did not all serve at once, but all were assigned to the brigade during the war.

8th Battalion, Lincolnshire Regiment 	
8th Battalion, Somerset Light Infantry 	
12th Battalion, West Yorkshire Regiment
10th Battalion, York & Lancaster Regiment
4th Battalion, Middlesex Regiment
63rd Machine Gun Company
63rd Trench Mortar Battery

References

Infantry brigades of the British Army in World War I